Ebon Andersson (1896-1969) was a Swedish politician (Moderate Party), and librarian.  

She was MP of the Second Chamber of the Parliament of Sweden in 1937–1945 and as MP of the First Chamber in 1946-1966.

References

1896 births
1969 deaths
20th-century Swedish politicians
20th-century Swedish women politicians
Women members of the Riksdag